Smålandsnytt is a Swedish regional news programme, broadcast by Sveriges Television (SVT).

The programme covers the three counties in the historical provinces of Småland and Öland in southeast Sweden: Jönköping County, Kalmar County and Kronoberg County. The programme is broadcast from studios located in Växjö, with district newsrooms in Jönköping and Kalmar.

External links
Smålandsnytt (Swedish)
Smålandsnytt's daily vodcast (Swedish)

Sveriges Television original programming
Swedish television news shows